The Masque of Kings is a 1937 three-act drama written by Maxwell Anderson. It was 
produced on Broadway  by the Theatre Guild and directed by Philip Moeller. Lee Simonson created the scenic and costume design. It ran for 89 performances from February 8, 1937 - April 24, 1937 at the Shubert Theatre.

Cast

 Glenn Anders as Koinoff
 Edith Atwater as Baronin von Neustadt
 Leo G. Carroll as	Count Joseph Hoyos
 Dudley Digges as Emperor Franz Joseph of Austria-Hungary
 Bijou Fernandez as Marie
 Pauline Frederick as Empress Elizabeth of Austria-Hungary
 Alan Hewitt as Fritz von Bremer
 Herbert Yost as Count Taafe
 Margo as Baroness Mary Vetsera
 Henry Hull as Crown Prince Rudolph of Austria-Hungary
 Henry Hull Jr. as Bratfish
 Pierre Chace as a servant
 Frank Downing as an officer
 Wyrley Birch as Sceps
 Edward Broadley as Loschek
 Charles Holden as a soldier
 Joseph Holland as Archduke John of Tuscany
 John Hoysradt as Baron von Neustadt
 Catherine Lawrence as a maid
 Benjamin Otis as D'Orsy
 Hobart Skidmore as a soldier
 Elizabeth Young as Louise

References

External links 
 

1937 plays
Broadway plays
Plays by Maxwell Anderson